"Balabarathi" Yedida Kameswara Rao, better known as Radio Annayya, was a freedom fighter and personal secretary for "Andhra Kesari" Tanguturi Prakasam Pantulu. He was born on September 13, 1913.

From 1936-1945 he worked as sub editor for the "Swarajyam" daily newspaper, the "Gruhalakshmi" Monthly magazine, and the "Prajamitra" fortnightly magazine. In 1949 he was invited by Sri Ayyagari Veerabhadra Rao to All India Radio in Vijayawada, where he worked for more than 30 years as a producer of children's programs, promoting children's listening clubs and nurturing children as singers and actors.

He died in 1996

Works 
Rao wrote stories, songs, ballets and dramas for children and published a song compilation entitled Palavelli. Another work entitled Oppulakuppa consists of plays about national integrity and the importance of education and agriculture.

His book of plays Ranga Bala - Ananda Mandiram is a compilation of children's stage plays. He established an educational institution called Bala Bharathi for the promotion of cultural activities for children.

He served as editor of Andhra Pradesh Balala Academy's Magazine Bala, Balachandrika, and many other Academy publications. His Bommalakolvu compilation retells the lives of great leaders and personalities. Vinura Vema is another compilation of moral stories.

His famous composition "OKA PILUPULO PILICHITE PALUKUTAVATA" was sung by famous singer then Late Smt. Srirangam Gopala Ratnam in the movie VENKATESWARA VYBHAVAM  which was a huge hit.

1913 births
1995 deaths